Charles A. Bachman (July 12, 1882 - May 14, 1966), born Chester Arthur Bachman, was an American film comedy actor. He appeared in 29 films between 1923 and 1940 for the Hal Roach Studio, primarily in Our Gang shorts and Laurel and Hardy comedies.

Filmography

References

External links

American male film actors
American male silent film actors
Hal Roach Studios actors
20th-century American male actors
1882 births
1966 deaths
Our Gang